Antonio de Lebrija was born in 1507, in Alcántara, Extremadura, Spain; and died in 1540, in Brozas, also in Extremadura. He was a Spanish conquistador who participated in the Spanish conquest of the Muisca and the Chimila peoples. He was the treasurer of the conquest expedition which left Santa Marta in April 1536 following the high quality salt trail, the Camino de la Sal, along the Suárez River up the slopes of the Eastern Ranges of the Colombian Andes towards the Muisca Confederation.

Expeditions

Early explorations 
Antonio de Lebrija was born in Alcántara in Extremadura in 1507, possibly a grandson of his namesake, historian and humanist Antonio de Nebrija. He left Spain for the New World with García de Lerma, arriving at Santa Marta in 1529. Under the command of de Lerma's nephew, Pedro de Lerma, de Lebrija participated in the conquest of the Chimila people in the Valle de Upar, Cesar. Here he discovered the confluence of the Magdalena River with the tributary that received his name, the Lebrija River.

As captain and treasurer, with seven years of experience in Tierra Firme, de Lebrija joined the expedition in search of El Dorado, which was led by Gonzalo Jiménez de Quesada and left Santa Marta in April 1536.

Foundation of Bogotá 

In 1538, on the Bogotá savanna, De Quesada sent De Lebrija, along with Juan de Céspedes, Juan de San Martín, and Gómez del Corral ahead to locate the most favourable site to found the capital of the New Kingdom of Granada. They selected a location in Teusaquillo, where Santa Fe de Bogotá was founded on August6, 1538.

Return to Spain 
After the two conquistadors Nikolaus Federmann and Sebastián de Belalcázar arrived in Bogotá, De Lebrija departed with De Quesada, and fellow conquistador Juan de Albarracín for Guataquí, a town they had founded. Guataquí, on the Magdalena River, was the port where De Albarracín ordered the construction of two small boats by the indigenous Panche people. From here, the Spanish conquistadors left for Cartagena, from where they sailed back to Spain. In Cartagena, in July 1539, de Lebrija authored a letter to the Real Audiencia of Santo Domingo, describing the activities in the New Kingdom. De Lebrija died in 1540 in Brozas, Extremadura.

Epítome 
Antonio de Lebríja is mentioned as Librixa, and in the early chronicle about the Spanish conquest, a work of uncertain authorship, Epítome de la conquista del Nuevo Reino de Granada.

Named after Antonio de Lebrija 
 Lebrija, Santander
 Lebrija River, Santander

See also 

 List of conquistadors in Colombia
 Spanish conquest of the Muisca
 Hernán Pérez de Quesada, Juan de Céspedes
 Gonzalo Jiménez de Quesada, Juan de Albarracín, Juan de San Martín

References

Bibliography

Further reading 
 
 
 
 
 
 

1507 births
1540 deaths
16th-century Spanish people
16th-century explorers
Spanish conquistadors
Extremaduran conquistadors
People from the Province of Cáceres
History of Colombia
History of the Muisca